Burnaby—Seymour was a federal electoral district in the province of British Columbia, Canada, that was represented in the House of Commons of Canada from 1968 to 1979.

This riding was created in 1966 from parts of Burnaby—Coquitlam, Burnaby—Richmond and Coast—Capilano ridings.  The riding originally consisted of the eastern part of North Vancouver plus areas of Burnaby north of the Grandview Highway and Edmonds Avenue, west of Sperling and north of Pandora Street.  That is, North Vancouver east of Lynn Creek plus the Burnaby Heights, Capitol Hill, Brentwood and Deer Lake neighbourhoods of Burnaby.

The riding's first election in 1968, is notable for being a showdown between the former leader of the British Columbia Liberal Party, Ray Perrault, and federal New Democratic Party leader Tommy Douglas.  Given that the North Shore portions of the riding were largely affluent and upper middle class in character and normally a Liberal bastion, Douglas' strong showing is not so surprising given the working-class and labour background of much of even the better-off parts of the riding in Burnaby.

When this riding was redistributed in 1976, the resulting Burnaby riding consistently returned NDP candidates - this was Svend Robinson's longtime seat.  North Vancouver—Burnaby returned a Progressive Conservative member (Chuck Cook) since its creation until it was abolished in 1987, as did its successor riding, the seat of North Vancouver until Reform Party member Ted White took over the seat on Cook's retirement.

In provincial politics, the equivalent area of North Vancouver was among the last holdouts of the provincial Liberal Party prior to it losing its support base to the Social Credit Party in the early 1980s. Jim Nielsen, who first unsuccessfully ran for the Progressive Conservative Party in Burnaby—Seymour in 1974 was subsequently elected in the 1975 provincial election as the MLA for Richmond. He was appointed as a cabinet minister and remained the MLA for Richmond until his resignation from provincial politics in 1986.

Members of Parliament

Election results

Successor ridings

The riding was abolished in 1976.  Successor ridings were:

Burnaby
North Vancouver—Burnaby

See also 

 List of Canadian federal electoral districts
 Past Canadian electoral districts

External links 
 Riding history from the Library of Parliament

Former federal electoral districts of British Columbia